In mathematics and computer algebra the factorization of a polynomial consists of decomposing it into a product of irreducible factors. This decomposition is theoretically possible and is unique for polynomials with coefficients in any field, but rather strong restrictions on the field of the coefficients are needed to allow the computation of the factorization by means of an algorithm. In practice, algorithms have been designed only for polynomials with coefficients in a finite field, in the field of rationals or in a finitely generated field extension of one of them.

All factorization algorithms, including the case of multivariate polynomials over the rational numbers, reduce the problem to this case; see polynomial factorization. It is also used for various applications of finite fields, such as coding theory (cyclic redundancy codes and BCH codes), cryptography (public key cryptography by the means of elliptic curves), and computational number theory.

As the reduction of the factorization of multivariate polynomials to that of univariate polynomials does not have any specificity in the case of coefficients in a finite field, only polynomials with one variable are considered in this article.

Background

Finite field

The theory of finite fields, whose origins can be traced back to the works of Gauss and Galois, has played a part in various branches of mathematics. Due to the applicability of the concept in other topics of mathematics and sciences like computer science there has been a resurgence of interest in finite fields and this is partly due to important applications in coding theory and cryptography. Applications of finite fields introduce some of these developments in cryptography, computer algebra and coding theory.

A finite field or Galois field is a field with a finite order (number of elements). The order of a finite field is always a prime or a power of prime. For each prime power q = pr, there exists exactly one finite field with q elements, up to isomorphism. This field is denoted GF(q) or Fq. If p is prime, GF(p) is the prime field of order p; it is the field of residue classes modulo p, and its p elements are denoted 0, 1, ..., p−1. Thus a = b in GF(p) means the same as a ≡ b (mod p).

Irreducible polynomials
Let F be a finite field. As for general fields, a non-constant polynomial f in F[x] is said to be irreducible over F if it is not the product of two polynomials of positive degree. A polynomial of positive degree that is not irreducible over F is called reducible over F.

Irreducible polynomials allow us to construct the finite fields of non-prime order. In fact, for a prime power q, let Fq be the finite field with q elements, unique up to isomorphism. A polynomial f of degree n greater than one, which is irreducible over Fq, defines a field extension of degree n which is isomorphic to the field with qn elements: the elements of this extension are the polynomials of degree lower than n; addition, subtraction and multiplication by an element of Fq are those of the polynomials; the product of two elements is the remainder of the division by f of their product as polynomials; the inverse of an element may be computed by the extended GCD algorithm (see Arithmetic of algebraic extensions).

It follows that, to compute in a finite field of non prime order, one needs to generate an irreducible polynomial. For this, the common method is to take a polynomial at random and test it for irreducibility. For sake of efficiency of the multiplication in the field, it is usual to search for polynomials of the shape xn + ax + b.

Irreducible polynomials over finite fields are also useful for Pseudorandom number generators using feedback shift registers and discrete logarithm over F2n.

The number of irreducible monic polynomials of degree n over Fq is the number of aperiodic necklaces, given by Moreau's necklace-counting function Mq(n). The closely related necklace function Nq(n) counts monic polynomials of degree n which are primary (a power of an irreducible); or alternatively irreducible polynomials of all degrees d which divide n.

Example 
The polynomial P = x4 + 1 is irreducible over Q but not over any finite field.

 On any field extension of F2, P = (x+1)4.
On every other finite field, at least one of −1, 2 and −2 is a square, because the product of two non-squares is a square and so we have
If  then 
If  then 
If  then

Complexity
Polynomial factoring algorithms use basic polynomial operations such as products, divisions, gcd, powers of one polynomial modulo another, etc. A multiplication of two polynomials of degree at most n can be done in O(n2) operations in Fq using "classical" arithmetic, or in O(nlog(n) log(log(n)) ) operations in Fq using "fast" arithmetic. A Euclidean division (division with remainder) can be performed within the same time bounds. The cost of a polynomial greatest common divisor between two polynomials of degree at most n can be taken as O(n2) operations in Fq using classical methods, or as O(nlog2(n) log(log(n)) ) operations in Fq using fast methods.  For polynomials h, g of degree at most n, the exponentiation hq mod g can be done with O(log(q)) polynomial products, using exponentiation by squaring method, that is O(n2log(q)) operations in Fq using classical methods, or O(nlog(q)log(n) log(log(n))) operations in Fq using fast methods.

In the algorithms that follow, the complexities are expressed in terms of number of arithmetic operations in Fq, using classical algorithms for the arithmetic of polynomials.

Factoring algorithms
Many algorithms for factoring polynomials over finite fields include the following three stages:
 Square-free factorization
 Distinct-degree factorization
 Equal-degree factorization
An important exception is Berlekamp's algorithm, which combines stages 2 and 3.

Berlekamp's algorithm

The Berlekamp's algorithm is historically important as being the first factorization algorithm, which works well in practice. However, it contains a loop on the elements of the ground field, which implies that it is practicable only over small finite fields. For a fixed ground field, its time complexity is polynomial, but, for general ground fields, the complexity is exponential in the size of the ground field.

Square-free factorization
The algorithm determines a square-free factorization for polynomials whose coefficients come from the finite field Fq of order q = pm with p a prime.  This algorithm firstly determines the derivative and then computes the gcd of the polynomial and its derivative. If it is not one then the gcd is again divided into the original polynomial, provided that the derivative is not zero (a case that exists for non-constant polynomials defined over finite fields).

This algorithm uses the fact that, if the derivative of a polynomial is zero, then it is a polynomial in xp, which is, if the coefficients belong to Fp, the pth power of the polynomial obtained by substituting x by x1/p. If the coefficients do not belong to Fp, the p-th root of a polynomial with zero derivative is obtained by the same substitution on x, completed by applying the inverse of the Frobenius automorphism to the coefficients. 

This algorithm works also over a field of characteristic zero, with the only difference that it never enters in the blocks of instructions where pth roots are computed. However, in this case, Yun's algorithm is much more efficient because it computes the greatest common divisors of polynomials of lower degrees. A consequence is that, when factoring a polynomial over the integers, the algorithm which follows is not used: one first computes the square-free factorization over the integers, and to factor the resulting polynomials, one chooses a p such that they remain square-free modulo p. 
 Algorithm: SFF (Square-Free Factorization)
     Input: A monic polynomial f in Fq[x] where q=pm
     Output: Square-free factorization of f
     R ← 1
    
     # Make w be the product (without multiplicity) of all factors of f that have 
     # multiplicity not divisible by p
     c ← gcd(f, f′)
     w ← f/c 
    
     # Step 1: Identify all factors in w
     i←1 
     while w ≠ 1 do
         y ← gcd(w, c)
         fac ← w/y
         R ← R·faci
         w ← y; c ← c/y; i ← i+1 
     end while
     # c is now the product (with multiplicity) of the remaining factors of f
    
     # Step 2: Identify all remaining factors using recursion
     # Note that these are the factors of f that have multiplicity divisible by p
     if c ≠ 1 then
         c ← c1/p
         R ← R·SFF(c)p
     end if 
    
     Output(R)
 
The idea is to identify the product of all irreducible factors of f with the same multiplicity. This is done in two steps. The first step uses the formal derivative of f to find all the factors with multiplicity not divisible by p. The second step identifies the remaining factors. As all of the remaining factors have multiplicity divisible by p, meaning they are powers of p, one can simply take the p-th square root and apply recursion.

Example of a square-free factorization
Let

to be factored over the field with three elements.

The algorithm computes first

Since the derivative is non-zero we have  and we enter the while loop. The third time through the loop also does not change . Since w = 1, we exit the while loop. Since c ≠ 1, it must be a perfect cube. The cube root of c, obtained by replacing x3 by x is x2 + 1, and calling the square-free procedure recursively determines that it is square-free. Therefore, cubing it and combining it with the value of R to that point gives the square-free decomposition

Distinct-degree factorization
This algorithm splits a square-free polynomial into a product of polynomials whose irreducible factors all have the same degree. Let f ∈ Fq[x] of degree n be the polynomial to be factored.

 Algorithm Distinct-degree factorization(DDF)
     Input: A monic square-free polynomial  
     Output: The set of all pairs , such that 
               has an irreducible factor of degree  and
     Begin
         
         while  do 
             
             if , then 
                 ;
                 
             end if
             
         end while;
         if , then ;
         if , then return ,
             else return 
     End
The correctness of the algorithm is based on the following:

Lemma. For i ≥ 1 the polynomial

is the product of all monic irreducible polynomials in Fq[x] whose degree divides i.

At first glance, this is not efficient since it involves computing the GCD of polynomials of a degree which is exponential in the degree of the input polynomial. However

may be replaced by

Therefore, we have to compute:

there are two methods:

Method I. Start from the value of

computed at the preceding step and to compute its q-th power modulo the new f*, using exponentiation by squaring method. This needs

arithmetic operations in Fq at each step, and thus

arithmetic operations for the whole algorithm.

Method II. Using the fact that the q-th power is a linear map over Fq we may compute its matrix with

operations. Then at each iteration of the loop, compute the product of a matrix by a vector (with O(deg(f)2) operations). This induces a total number of operations in Fq which is

Thus this second method is more efficient and is usually preferred. Moreover, the matrix that is computed in this method is used, by most algorithms, for equal-degree factorization (see below); thus using it for the distinct-degree factorization saves further computing time.

Equal-degree factorization

Cantor–Zassenhaus algorithm

In this section, we consider the factorization of a monic squarefree univariate polynomial f, of degree n, over a finite field Fq, which has r ≥ 2 pairwise distinct irreducible factors  each of degree d.

We first describe an algorithm by Cantor and Zassenhaus (1981) and then a variant that has a slightly better complexity. Both are probabilistic algorithms whose running time depends on random choices (Las Vegas algorithms), and have a good average running time. In next section we describe an algorithm by Shoup (1990), which is also an equal-degree factorization algorithm, but is deterministic. All these algorithms require an odd order q for the field of coefficients. For more factorization algorithms see e.g. Knuth's book The Art of Computer Programming volume 2.

 Algorithm Cantor–Zassenhaus algorithm.
     Input: A finite field Fq of odd order q.
            A monic square free polynomial f in Fq[x] of degree n = rd, 
                 which has r ≥ 2 irreducible factors each of degree d
     Output: The set of monic irreducible factors of f.
 
     Factors := {f};
     while Size(Factors) < r do,
         Choose h in Fq[x] with deg(h) < n at random;
         
         for each u in Factors with deg(u) > d do
             if gcd(g, u) ≠ 1 and gcd(g, u) ≠ u, then
                 Factors:= Factors;
             endif
     endwhile
 
     return Factors

The correctness of this algorithm relies on the fact that the ring Fq[x]/f is a direct product of the fields Fq[x]/fi where fi runs on the irreducible factors of f. As all these fields have qd elements, the component of g in any of these fields is zero with probability

This implies that the polynomial gcd(g, u) is the product of the factors of g for which the component of g is zero.

In the typical case where dlog(q) > n, this complexity may be reduced to

by choosing h in the kernel of the linear map

and replacing the instruction

by

The proof of validity is the same as above, replacing the direct product of the fields Fq[x]/fi by the direct product of their subfields with q elements. It may be noted that this algorithm works also if the factors have not the same degree (in this case the number r of factors, needed for stopping the while loop, is found as the dimension of the kernel). Nevertheless, the complexity is slightly better if square-free factorization is done before using this algorithm (as n may decrease with square-free factorization, this reduces the complexity of the critical steps).

Victor Shoup's algorithm
Like the algorithms of the preceding section, Victor Shoup's algorithm is an equal-degree factorization algorithm. Unlike them, it is a deterministic algorithm. However, it is less efficient, in practice, than the algorithms of preceding section. For Shoup's algorithm, the input is restricted to polynomials over prime fields Fp.

The worst case time complexity of Shoup's algorithm has a factor  Although exponential, this complexity is much better than previous deterministic algorithms (Berlekamp's algorithm) which have  as a factor.

Let g = g1 ... gk be the desired factorization, where the gi are distinct monic irreducible polynomials of degree d. Let n = deg(g) = kd. We consider the ring R = Fq[x]/g and denote also by x the image of x in R. The ring R is the direct product of the fields Ri = Fq[x]/gi, and we denote by pi the natural homomorphism from the R onto Ri. The Galois group of Ri over Fq is cyclic of order d, generated by the  field automorphism u → up. It follows that the roots of gi in Ri are

Like in the preceding algorithm, this algorithm uses the same subalgebra B of R as the Berlekamp's algorithm, sometimes called the "Berlekamp subagebra" and defined as

A subset S of B is said a separating set if, for every 1 ≤ i < j ≤ k there exists s ∈ S such that . In the preceding algorithm, a separating set is constructed by choosing at random the elements of S. In Shoup's algorithm, the separating set is constructed in the following way. Let s in R[Y] be such that

Then  is a separating set because  for i =1, ..., k (the two monic polynomials have the same roots). As the gi are pairwise distinct, for every pair of distinct indexes (i, j), at least one of the coefficients sh will satisfy 

Having a separating set, Shoup's algorithm proceeds as the last algorithm of the preceding section, simply by replacing the instruction "choose at random h in the kernel of the linear map " by "choose h + i with h in S and i in {1, ..., k−1}".

Time complexity
As described in previous sections, for the factorization over finite fields, there are randomized algorithms of polynomial time complexity (for example Cantor-Zassenhaus algorithm). There are also deterministic algorithms with a polynomial average complexity (for example Shoup's algorithm).

The existence of a deterministic algorithm with a polynomial worst-case complexity is still an open problem.

Rabin's test of irreducibility
Like distinct-degree factorization algorithm, Rabin's algorithm is based on the Lemma stated above. Distinct-degree factorization algorithm tests every d not greater than half the degree of the input polynomial. Rabin's algorithm takes advantage that the factors are not needed for considering fewer d. Otherwise, it is similar to distinct-degree factorization algorithm. It is based on the following fact.

Let p1, ..., pk, be all the prime divisors of n, and denote , for 1 ≤ i ≤ k polynomial f in Fq[x] of degree n is irreducible in Fq[x] if and only if , for 1 ≤ i ≤ k, and f divides . In fact, if f has a factor of degree not dividing n, then f does not divide ; if f has a factor of degree dividing n, then this factor divides at least one of the 

 Algorithm Rabin Irreducibility Test
     Input: A monic polynomial f in Fq[x] of degree n, 
         p1, ..., pk all distinct prime divisors of n.
     Output: Either "f is irreducible" or "f is reducible".
 
     for j = 1 to k do 
         ;
     for i = 1 to k do 
         ;
         g := gcd(f, h);
         if g ≠ 1, then return "f is reducible" and STOP;
     end for;
     ;
     if g = 0, then return "f is irreducible", 
         else return "f is reducible"

The basic idea of this algorithm is to compute  starting from the smallest  by repeated squaring or using the Frobenius automorphism, and then to take the correspondent gcd. Using the elementary polynomial arithmetic, the computation of the matrix of the Frobenius automorphism needs  operations in Fq, the computation of

needs O(n3) further operations, and the algorithm itself needs O(kn2) operations, giving a total of  operations in Fq.

See also
 Berlekamp's algorithm
 Cantor–Zassenhaus algorithm
 Polynomial factorization

References

KEMPFERT,H (1969) On the Factorization of Polynomials Department of Mathematics, The Ohio State University,Columbus,Ohio 43210
Shoup,Victor (1996) Smoothness and Factoring Polynomials over Finite Fields Computer Science Department University of Toronto
 Von Zur Gathen, J.; Panario, D. (2001). Factoring Polynomials Over Finite Fields: A Survey. Journal of Symbolic Computation, Volume 31, Issues 1–2, January 2001, 3--17.
Gao Shuhong, Panario Daniel,Test and Construction of Irreducible Polynomials over Finite Fields Department of mathematical Sciences, Clemson University, South Carolina, 29634–1907, USA. and Department of computer science University of Toronto, Canada M5S-1A4
Shoup, Victor (1989) New Algorithms for Finding Irreducible Polynomials over Finite Fields Computer Science Department University of Wisconsin–Madison
Geddes, Keith O.; Czapor, Stephen R.; Labahn, George (1992). Algorithms for computer algebra. Boston, MA: Kluwer Academic Publishers. pp. xxii+585. .

Notes

External links
 Some irreducible polynomials http://www.math.umn.edu/~garrett/m/algebra/notes/07.pdf
 Field and Galois Theory :http://www.jmilne.org/math/CourseNotes/FT.pdf
 Galois Field:http://designtheory.org/library/encyc/topics/gf.pdf
 Factoring polynomials over finite fields: http://www.science.unitn.it/~degraaf/compalg/polfact.pdf

Polynomials
Algebra
Computer algebra
Coding theory
Cryptography
Computational number theory
Polynomials factorization algorithms